Shimanovsk is a town in Amur Oblast, Russia, located on the Bolshaya Pyora River (a right-hand tributary of the Zeya),  northwest of Blagoveshchensk. Population:

History
It was founded in conjunction with the construction of the Amur railway in 1910, originally named Pyora after the river on which it stands. It was renamed Gondatti in 1914 in honor of the then-governor of Amur Oblast, Nikolay Gondatti. In 1920, it was renamed Vladimiro-Shimanovsky after Vladimir Shimanovsky, a railway engineer and member of the Red Army who was shot dead in Blagoveshchensk during the Russian Civil War. It was granted town status and its name shortened to Shimanovsk in 1950.

During the construction of the Baikal-Amur Mainline in the 1970s, Shimanovsk saw new growth as a center for production of construction materials.

Administrative and municipal status
Within the framework of administrative divisions, Shimanovsk serves as the administrative center of Shimanovsky District, even though it is not a part of it. As an administrative division, it is incorporated separately as Shimanovsk Urban Okrug—an administrative unit with the status equal to that of the districts. As a municipal division, this administrative unit also has urban okrug status.

Economy
The town's primary industries are production of heavy machinery and building materials. Kranspetsburmash corporation produces cranes and drilling equipment in Shimanovsk.

Transportation
The town has a railway station (Shimanovskaya) on the Trans-Siberian Railway.

Climate
Shimanovsk, like most of Amur Oblast, has a monsoon influenced humid continental climate (Köppen climate classification Dwb), closely bordering on a subarctic climate (Dwc).

In winter, the wind is weak because of the constant presence of the dense low-level Siberian High, which drives frigid air from the Siberian “cold pole”.

References

Notes

Sources

Cities and towns in Amur Oblast
Populated places established in 1910